Park Young-Hwan (박영환, born. 1942, in South Korea) is a South Korean footballer.
He was coach of FC Seoul and Jeju United FC and He was secretary general of K-League executive office in 1996.

References

Living people
South Korean footballers
1942 births
FC Seoul non-playing staff
Chungju Hummel FC managers
Association footballers not categorized by position
South Korean football managers